Burzyński (feminine: Burzyńska; plural: Burzyńscy) is a Polish surname and habitational name from the village of Burzyn in the Podlaskie Voivodeship. It derives from the noun burza ("tempest", "storm"). At the end of the 20th century, 9,583 people bore the name in Poland.

Burzyński is associated with the Trzywdar coat of arms.

People
 Adam Prosper Burzyński (1755–1830), Polish bishop
 Claire Burzynski (born 1986), Australian wheelchair basketball player
 J. Bradley Burzynski (born 1955), American politician
 Joanna Burzyńska (born 1968), Polish windsurfer
 Lidia Burzyńska (born 1964), Polish politician
 Stanisław Burzyński (born 1943), controversial Polish-American alternative cancer doctor
 Stanisław Burzyński (footballer) (1948–1991), Polish footballer
 Zbigniew Burzyński (1902–1971), Polish balloonist

References

See also
 
 

Polish-language surnames